Looking for Lola is a 1997 American romantic comedy film, starring Mark Kassen and Ara Celi. It was co-written, co-produced and directed by Boaz Davidson.

Plot
Mike is living an unsuccessful life, but lies to his parents about it. He meets Lola, a beautiful, Mexican dancer. When Mike's parents decide to visit him, he convinces Lola to pretend to be his girlfriend.

Cast
 Mark Kassen as Mike Greenbaum
 Ara Celi as Lola
 Adam Biesk as Benny
 Vincent Ventresca as Tony
 Michael Kagan as Max Greenbaum
 Brenda Pickleman as Doris Greenbaum
 Leeza Davidson as Sally Greenbaum

References

External links
 
 
 Looking For Lola at Film Affinity

1997 films
1997 romantic comedy films
Films directed by Boaz Davidson
American romantic comedy films
1990s English-language films
Films produced by Boaz Davidson
Films with screenplays by Boaz Davidson
1990s American films